Monte Astu or Monte Asto is a mountain in the department of Haute-Corse on the island of Corsica, France.

Location

The peak is on the border between the communes of Lama and Sorio.
It is to the east of the D8 road from Pietralba via Lama to Urtaca.
It is the highest point of a ridge that includes the  Cima di Grimaseta and  Petra San Ghiaccu to the south and the  Monte a l'Alturaia,  Cima a Muzzelli and  Monte Ambrica to the north.
Another ridge runs eastward through the 1333 Monti di Peru, 1042 A Genucula and 717 Croce d'Aculaghja to San-Gavino-di-Tenda.
The Fiume di Gargalagne, a tributary of the Ostriconi, drains the west of the ridge.
Streams from the southeast of the ridge feed the Fiumi Raghiunti, the upper section of the Aliso River.

Physical

Monte Astu is the highest point in the Tenda massif between Saint-Florent and L'Île-Rousse in Haute-Corse.
This is a granitic mole partially detached from its mica schist encasement which still remains on its periphery and on its roof.

Hiking
It is considered difficult, and takes about six hours.
The path winds through Corsican maquis shrubland along a marked path past the Refuge de Prunincu to the ridge overlooking the Puleghio ravine.
A small climb across riprap is needed to reach the summit, not advised for people with vertigo.

From the summit there is a beautiful panorama over northern Corsica, including the Agriates Desert, the Monte Cinto massif, Cap Corse and the Tuscan Archipelago.
The view includes the eastern plain, the Saint-Florent bay to the north and L'Île-Rousse to the west.

Gallery

Notes

Sources

Mountains of Haute-Corse